Kofi Koduah Sarpong is a Ghanaian business executive and consultant. He is a member of the New Patriotic Party of Ghana. He served as Executive Chairman of Ghanaian football club, Kumasi Asante Kotoko from 2010 to 2013. 

He has worked for the International Cocoa Organization in London and Ghana Cocoa Board. He is the chief executive officer of GNPC as of 2017.

Early life and education
Kofi Sarpong was born at Nsuta-Beposo in the Ashanti Region of Ghana. He obtained his GCE Ordinary Level certificate from the Seventh Day Adventist Secondary School in Bekwai and his GCE Advanced Level from Sekondi College. He gained admission to the University of Ghana to pursue a course in Business Administration. He graduated with a Bachelor of Science in Business Administration. He gained a World Bank scholarship in 1987 to study a Master of Business Administration from the University of Ghana. Upon completing his master's education, he was awarded a graduate scholarship to pursue a Master of Accountancy at the University of Glasgow in 1990. A Commonwealth Scholarship offered him the opportunity to apply for a Doctor of Philosophy degree in Industrial and Business Studies from the University of Warwick in the United Kingdom. Kofi Sarpong also holds a Master of Arts in Ministry from the Trinity Theological Seminary, Legon. He is a Chartered accountant from the Association of Chartered Certified Accountants, United Kingdom.

Working life 
Sarpong was employed as an assistant accountant in 1979 at the now defunct Meat Marketing Board. In 1980, he was employed as Deputy Chief Accountant at Ghana Food Distribution Corporation. He rose through the ranks at the corporation to become Chief Accountant and subsequently general manager of the corporation. He resigned in 1990 to further his studies outside Ghana. Upon his return to Ghana in 1993,  Sarpong was employed as Deputy Chief executive of Ghana Cocoa Board. He took up appointment at the International Cocoa Organization, London in 1998 and served as the Head of Administration and Financial Services Division in 2001.

In 2004, the then President of Ghana, John Kufuor, appointed Sarpong as the Deputy managing director of the Tema Oil Refinery. He was made the managing director of the refinery in 2007. When the John Evans Atta-Mills administration was voted into power in 2009, Sarpong was relieved of the position.

From 2010 to 2013, Sarpong served as Executive Chairman of Kumasi Asante Kotoko Sporting Club. He was appointed by Otumfuo Nana Osei Tutu II, King of the Asante Kingdom. The club won two Ghana Premier League titles, two Champion of Champions titles, and two FA Cup Runners-up positions. Strategic co-operations with foreign clubs were also established with Sunderland A.F.C. in the United Kingdom, TP Mazembe in DR Congo and Petro Luanda in Angola. After Asante Kotoko, Sarpong took up the position of Chief executive of The Global Haulage Group, a Ghanaian cocoa buying and exporting company. He was also the chairman of the boards of The Royal Bank, Ghana and Imperial General Assurance Ltd. He resigned from boards in 2016.
K.K Sarpong was appointed chancellor of UPSA in January 2022.

CEO of GNPC 
In February 2017, President Nana Akufo-Addo, appointed Sarpong as Acting chief executive officer of Ghana National Petroleum Corporation. He replaced Alex Mould who had served as CEO since 2013.

References

Living people
University of Ghana alumni
Alumni of the University of Warwick
Alumni of the University of Glasgow
Ghanaian accountants
People from Ashanti Region
Ghanaian businesspeople
Sekondi College alumni
Year of birth missing (living people)
Trinity Theological Seminary, Legon alumni
Ghanaian football chairmen and investors